, better known as SO-SO is a Japanese beatboxer, looper, singer-songwriter and producer. He is currently a member of the beatbox crew SARUKANI.

Early life 
Born in Osaka, when he took piano classes since he was 6 years old because he was influenced by his friends around him. He was joined a theater company, Osaka Himawari from elementary school and 10 years into his junior school graduation. He was mainly an extra in musicals, movies, and dramas such as a student in the Showa era and as a child during the war. In his freshman year of high school, he watched beatbox videos on YouTube and self-taught. On his birthday in second grade of high school, he received a looper, BOSS RC-505, from his mother and started a loop station. Entered in Osaka College of Music in 2018, he studied composition, music theory, mixing and continues to produce music.

Career 
In April 2019, he became popular because his first Japanese beatboxer to enter the top 4 in the loopstation category of the international competition Grand Beatbox Battle held in Poland and on July, he won the championship in the loopstation category of the Asian Beatbox Championship in Taiwan in the same year. On 2020, he has formed and active in beatbox crew SARUKANI and duo group DOILii, with Nijiiro Samurai. He is also start working as a DJ in December 2020.

In October 2021, he participated in international competition Grand Beatbox Battle held in Poland, and his won the championship in category Tag-team Loopstation with teammate, Rusy as SORRY and runner-up in Crew with SARUKANI.

Styles 
SO-SO has a high voice that produces a unique sound from his mouth. While self-taught beatboxing from the video Reeps One and starting looping every day, he was inspired by various music, one of which was so heavily influenced by Canadian DJ REZZ that he was fascinated by bass music. After that, he studied electronic game music, musicals and others, so he created his voice with his own musical view.

SO-SO is known to have a unique style in the way of fashion, colorful clothes, wearing glasses and haircut style like as anime character Nobita.

Other ventures
SO-SO has maintained numerous national endorsement deals in various industries throughout their career. He starred in the commercial for Fuji School Bag on 2019–2020. In April 2021, he is in commercial for footwear retails ABC-Mart.

Performance in competitions

Discography

Albums

Extended plays

Singles

As lead artist

As promotional singles

Concerts

Co-headlining 
 SARUKANI 1st Tour Live "#BKPK2022" (2022)

Filmography

Television shows

Musical theaters

References

External links
 

Japanese beatboxers
Living people
1999 births